RAM-378(7,8-Dihydro-14-hydroxy-N-phenethylnormorphine) is an opioid analgesic. It is the N-phenethyl derivative of hydromorphinol.

See also
 14-Cinnamoyloxycodeinone
 14-Phenylpropoxymetopon
 7-PET
 N-Phenethylnormorphine
 N-Phenethyl-14-ethoxymetopon
 Phenomorphan
 Ro4-1539

References

4,5-Epoxymorphinans
Semisynthetic opioids